The Convent of Jesus and Mary, Delhi, India, or CJM, is a girls day school in Delhi, India. Established in 1919, it is one of a network of Convents of Jesus and Mary in India and the UK.

History
The school was  founded in 1919 by the order of the Religious of Jesus and Mary, a Roman Catholic congregation, in Lyon, France, in October, 1818, by Claudine Thévenet (Mary of St. Ignatius). It moved to its current building behind the Sacred Heart Cathedral in 1926.

It has 2,000 students and is the alma mater of several eminent women in or from India. Situated near the Gol Dak Khana (Round Post Office), its grounds border the St. Columba's School (for boys). As a result, these are considered "sister and brother schools" and many students have siblings in the other school. Saint Claudine Thevenet was the foundress. The school celebrates her feast day on 3 February. Blessed Dina Bélanger started the congregation.

Annual events such as Prize day, Kaleidoscope, sports day etc. are sponsored by the OSA (Old Students Association). There are quiz competitions and magic shows. Festivals like Independence Day and Diwali are celebrated.

Each grade is annually taken on trips, from hill stations to various places of heritage. Foreign trips in collaboration with Edterra are also organized for senior grades .

In India it is categorized as a minority school and starts from nursery going up to class 12.
It offers Arts, Commerce and Science as streams after class 10.

CJM is known for its discipline.

Notable alumni
 Agatha Sangma, Member of Parliament, Lok Sabha
 Anna M.M. Vetticad, journalist and Social media consultant
 Aruna Roy, activist
 Arundhati Virmani, historian
 Aung San Suu Kyi, Burmese Democracy activist
 Bhaswati Mukherjee, diplomat*
 Divya Seth, Actor
 Devika Bhagat, Bollywood screenwriter and dialogue writer
 Jessica Lal, ex-model, murdered in 1999
 Kavita Krishnamurthi, singer
 Priyanka Gandhi, daughter of Sonia Gandhi, Indian politician
 Sabrina Dhawan, Screenwriter, Monsoon Wedding and others. 
 Kumari Selja, Former Union Minister of State, Independent Charge, Ministry of Housing and Urban Poverty Alleviation
 Sheila Dikshit, Chief Minister of Delhi
 Sujata Madhok, journalist and activist
 Supriti, Diversity and Inclusion Consultant
 Sushma Seth, actress
 Adita Wahi, Actress
 Ritnika Nayan, Author, Entrepreneur
 Tina dabi, IAS Officer, UPSC

House system
CJM follows a house system in which students are divided into four groups or houses.
  Encounter (red)
  Endeavor (blue)
  Endurance (green)
  Enterprise (yellow)

See also
 Convent of Jesus and Mary
 Jesus and Mary College, Delhi

References

External links
 Official website
 Convent of Jesus and Mary, Murree website
 Convent of Jesus and Mary, Murree past pupils website

Catholic schools in India
Christian schools in Delhi
Girls' schools in Delhi
Educational institutions established in 1919
1919 establishments in India